Igenchelyar (İgenselär) is a rural locality (a village) in Utyakovsky Selsoviet, Gafuriysky District, Bashkortostan, Russia. The population was 107 as of 2010. There are 3 streets.

Geography 
Igenchelyar is located 18 km southwest of Krasnousolsky (the district's administrative centre) by road. Tugayevo is the nearest rural locality.

References 

Rural localities in Gafuriysky District